Justice Samuel Joshua Jacobs AO QC (1920–2011) was a highly respected lawyer and judge.

After being compulsorily retired at age 70 in 1990, he was recalled and appointed as Royal Commissioner into the inquiry into the State Bank of South Australia debt crisis.

Early life

Jacobs was born 6 December 1920 in the Adelaide suburb of Glenelg, the son of Sir Roland Jacobs. He was educated at Scotch College, Adelaide (1929–1938) and the University of Adelaide where he obtained his law degree in 1948 – his studies were interrupted by World War II. He entered private practice after graduation.

Career and achievements
He became a member of the Council of Law Society in 1957, a Queens Council in 1965 and was President of the Law Society of SA from 1970 to 1972.  He was appointed as a Justice of the Supreme Court of SA in 1973.

He served in a wide range of organisations, including:
 member of the Council of Governors of Scotch College from 1966 
 member of the State Law Reform committee
 member of the Board of Management of the Kindergarten Union of SA 
 associated with the work of the crippled Children’s Association  
 from 1966 to 1973 was a Director of the SA Gas Co. 
 member of the Winston Churchill Memorial Trust
 Hon. Colonel of the Adelaide University Regiment from 1979
 member of the University of Adelaide Council for 15 years
 Deputy Chancellor of the University of Adelaide (1984–1993)

Jacobs was named an Officer of the Order of Australia in the 1982 Queen's Birthday Honours List.  He received the Centenary Medal in 2001. He was awarded honorary doctorates by the Universities of Adelaide and South Australia.

Death
He died 11 October 2011, survived by four children, five grandchildren and three great-grandchildren.

References

1920 births
2011 deaths
People educated at Scotch College, Adelaide
Lawyers from Adelaide
Adelaide Law School alumni
Officers of the Order of Australia
Judges of the Supreme Court of South Australia
20th-century Australian judges